Wisborough Green is a village and civil parish in the north of the Chichester district of West Sussex, England,  west of Billingshurst on the A272 road.

Newbridge Wharf(e), beneath the bridge, was an important part of the local transport system in the nineteenth century, before which, in the parish much further south, Pallingham Quay or Wharf was the limit of most navigation.

Governance
An electoral ward in the same name exists. This ward includes Kirdford and at the 2011 Census has a ward population of 2,477.

Features
Around the large village green, used for playing cricket and football are two pubs, the Cricketers Arms and the Three Crowns, and a village shop. The cricket pavilion on the green doubles as a social club. In an outland neighbourhood of the parish, the others being Burdocks and Strood Green, Newpounds, is public house The Bat & Ball, near Fishers Farm, a farm adventure park.

Since the late 19th century a primary school has served the parish. The older building was closed in 1996 and was converted into houses. Since then the whole school has been on the same site, opposite.

Statistics

The parish covers a rather large 1756.9 hectares (4339.5 acres). The 2001 census recorded a population of 1,360 people (667 male and 693 female) living in 570 households, with an average of 2.93 people per house. Of 964 people aged 16–74, 621 were economically active.

Places of worship
The Church of England parish church of St. Peter ad Vincula (St Peter in Chains) is on higher ground near a small pond with pollarded willow trees. Its rare dedication in Britain is for the saint and Basilica of San Pietro in Vincoli in Rome. The current vicar is the Reverend Clive Jenkins.

The village has a Methodist church and independent, family church that meets in the village hall.

Notable residents
The actor and actress, husband and wife James Bolam and Susan Jameson, live in the village. Pink Floyd guitarist David Gilmour lives on a farm just outside the village.

References

External links

Villages in West Sussex